VCMG (also stylized as Vcmg) were an English electronic music duo, consisting of Vince Clarke (Erasure, Yazoo, Depeche Mode) and Martin L. Gore (Depeche Mode). Reuniting the two original members of the original Depeche Mode lineup over 30 years after Vince Clarke left the band after the release of their debut album Speak & Spell. Their debut album, titled Ssss, was released on 12 March 2012 by Mute Records. An EP titled Spock was released (initially exclusively on Beatport) on 30 November 2011. Their second EP, Single Blip, was also released initially exclusive to Beatport on 20 February 2012. Their third EP, Aftermaths was released on 20 August 2012.

In 2015, Gore released a solo album titled MG as a reference to VCMG.

Discography

Studio albums

Extended plays
 Spock (2011)
 Single Blip (2012)
 Aftermaths (2012)

References

External links
 VCMG at Mute Records

2011 establishments in England
Musical groups established in 2011
English electronic music duos
English techno music groups
Male musical duos
Mute Records artists